Hermias (Hermeias or , Hermias) is the name of:

 Hermias of Atarneus
 Hermeias, the minister of Seleucus III Ceraunus
 Saint Hermias of Comana, an early saint and martyr of the Eastern Orthodox Church
 Hermias (apologist), the Christian apologist
 Hermias (philosopher)